was a  after Kōnin and before Jōwa. This period spanned the years from January 824  through January 834.

Change of era
 February 6, 824 : The new era name was created to mark an event or series of events. The previous era ended and the new one commenced in Kōnin 15, on the 5th day of the 1st month of 824.

Events of the Tenchō era
 824 (Tenchō 1): This summer was entirely dry; and prayers for rain were offered by the Buddhist priest Kūkai, who is also known by the posthumous name, Kōbō-Daishi. Those prayers seemed to be answered when it did begin to rain sometime later.
 824 (Tenchō 1, 7th month): The former-Emperor Heizei died at age 51.
 825 (Tenchō 2, 11th month): The former-Emperor Saga celebrated his 40th birthday.
 826 (Tenchō 3, 11th month): Kōbō-Daishi counsels the emperor to build a pagoda near To-ji in Kyoto.

Notes

References
 Brown, Delmer M. and Ichirō Ishida, eds. (1979).  Gukanshō: The Future and the Past. Berkeley: University of California Press. ;  OCLC 251325323
 Nussbaum, Louis-Frédéric and Käthe Roth. (2005).  Japan encyclopedia. Cambridge: Harvard University Press. ;  OCLC 58053128
 Titsingh, Isaac. (1834). Nihon Odai Ichiran; ou,  Annales des empereurs du Japon.  Paris: Royal Asiatic Society, Oriental Translation Fund of Great Britain and Ireland. OCLC 5850691
 Varley, H. Paul. (1980). A Chronicle of Gods and Sovereigns: Jinnō Shōtōki of Kitabatake Chikafusa. New York: Columbia University Press. ;  OCLC 6042764

External links 
 National Diet Library, "The Japanese Calendar" -- historical overview plus illustrative images from library's collection

Japanese eras
9th century in Japan
824 beginnings
834 endings